Second Nature is a collaborative album by Atom Heart, Tetsu Inoue and Bill Laswell. It was released on August 14, 1995 by FAX +49-69/450464.

Track listing

Personnel 
Adapted from the Second Nature liner notes.
Musicians
Atom Heart – effects, producer
Tetsu Inoue – effects, producer
Bill Laswell – effects, producer
Technical personnel
Layng Martine – assistant engineer, editing
Dave McKean – cover art
Robert Musso – engineering
Aldo Sampieri – design

Release history

References

External links 
 Second Nature at Bandcamp
 

1995 albums
Collaborative albums
Tetsu Inoue albums
Bill Laswell albums
Uwe Schmidt albums
FAX +49-69/450464 albums
Albums produced by Tetsu Inoue
Albums produced by Bill Laswell